Whitetopping is the covering of an existing asphalt pavement with a layer of Portland cement concrete. Whitetopping is divided into types depending on the thickness of the concrete layer and whether the layer is bonded to the asphalt substrate. Unbonded whitetopping, also called conventional whitetopping, uses concrete thicknesses of 20cm (8") or more that is not bonded to the asphalt. Bonded whitetopping uses thicknesses of 5 to 15cm (2-6") bonded to the asphalt pavement and is divided into two types, thin and ultrathin. The bond is made by texturing the asphalt. Thin whitetopping uses a bonded layer of concrete that is 10 - 15cm (4-6") thick while an ultrathin layer is 5 to 10 cm (2-4") thick. Ultrathin whitetopping is suitable for light duty uses, such as roads with low traffic volume, parking lots and small airports. Fiber reinforced concrete is used in some thin whitetopping overlays and almost all ultrathin whitetopping overlays.

Whitetopping is suitable for asphalt pavement with little deterioration, although repairs can be made to the asphalt if necessary. If the pavement is badly damaged, it should be completely removed and a new concrete pavement should be installed. The pavement should be relatively hard, as well. Deterioration of overlays is significantly increased on asphalt bases with high viscosity. If a grade or a distance between the pavement and a bridge needs to be preserved, the asphalt can be milled so that the height of the pavement does not change. However, whitetopping requires the asphalt layer to be at least 7.5cm (3") thick. If necessary, a section of new concrete roadway can be placed under a bridge with gentle slopes on either side that meet up with the whitetopped portions of the road.

See also 
 Cool pavement

References

Washington State Department of Transportation's Pavement Guide Interactive
Federal Highway Administration Ultra-Thin Whitetopping (UTW) Project
National Academy of Sciences Thin and Ultra-Thin Whitetopping

Building engineering
Materials
Concrete
Cement